Joseph Olugbenga Olowu (born 27 November 1999) is a Nigerian professional footballer who plays for Doncaster Rovers, as a defender.

Early and personal life
Olowu was born in Ibadan, Nigeria, moving to England as a child. He is eligible to represent both England and Nigeria at international level.

Career
Olowu began his career with Arsenal at the age of 8, spending time on loan at Cork City in 2020, and Wealdstone in 2021. He left Arsenal at the end of the 2020–21 season (after 13 years with the club) and went on trial with Manchester United, before signing for Doncaster Rovers in September 2021.

Career statistics

References

1999 births
Living people
Nigerian footballers
English footballers
Arsenal F.C. players
Cork City F.C. players
Wealdstone F.C. players
Doncaster Rovers F.C. players
League of Ireland players
National League (English football) players
English Football League players
Association football defenders
Sportspeople from Ibadan